USS Puritan was one of two ocean-going ironclad monitors designed by John Ericsson during the American Civil War of 1861–1865. Launched in mid-1864, construction was suspended sometime in 1865. The Navy Department had specified two twin-gun turrets over Ericsson's protests, but finally agreed to delete the second turret in late 1865. The Navy Department evaded the Congressional refusal to order new ships in 1874 by claiming that the Civil War-era ship was being repaired while building a new monitor of the same name.

Description
The ship had a tonnage of 3,265 tons burthen and displaced .

The monitor was originally intended to mount two twin-gun turrets, but Ericsson persuaded the Navy Department to switch to a single turret armed with a pair of  smoothbore, muzzle-loading, Dahlgren guns. None of the guns were completed before the end of the war.

Construction
Buoyed by the victory gained by Ericsson's  during the Battle of Hampton Roads in early March 1862, the Navy Department decided later that month to build several ocean-going monitors in case the British or the French decided to intervene in the war. Ericsson submitted preliminary designs in May and Secretary of the Navy Gideon Welles authorized two ships, one with a single turret (Dictator) and a larger one with two turrets the following month. On 28 July the Navy Department awarded Ericsson with a contract for Puritan, having changed the name of the ship from Ericsson's submission of Protector. He subcontracted the hull of the Puritan to the Continental Iron Works of Greenpoint, Brooklyn, and the propulsion machinery to the Allaire Iron Works of New York City. The ship was laid down in 1863 and was launched on 2 July 1864. However, due to delays in building and the casting of the 20-inch smoothbores, her construction was suspended in 1865 and she was never completed.

After the war, Puritan deteriorated on the stocks and she was sold to John Roach in 1874. Although Congress was informed by the Navy Department that the Civil War-era ship was being repaired, a new iron-hulled monitor of the same name was built with repair money and the proceeds of her sale because Congress refused to fund any new construction at this time.

Citations

References

Further reading
 

Monitors of the United States Navy
Ironclad warships of the Union Navy
Ships built in Brooklyn
Ships of the Union Navy
1864 ships
Cancelled ships of the United States Navy